Scurlock is a surname. Notable people with the surname include:

Addison N. Scurlock (1883–1964), American photographer
Doc Scurlock (1850–1929), American old west figure; part of Lincoln County War
Eddy C. Scurlock (1905–1988), American oil tycoon
James Scurlock (born 1971), American documentary filmmaker
Kliph Scurlock (born 1973), American musician
Mary Steele, née Scurlock (1678–1718), Welsh wife of Irishman Sir Richard Steele
Mial Scurlock (1809–1836), a defender in the Battle of the Alamo
Mike Scurlock (born 1972), American football player
Ovie Scurlock (born 1918), American jockey

See also
Scurlockstown, a townland in Scurlockstown civil parish, barony of Lower Deece, County Meath, Ireland
Scurlockstown, Burry, a townland in Burry civil parish, barony of Upper Kells, County Meath, Ireland
Scurlockstown (civil parish), civil parish in County Meath, Ireland, which the R164 road runs through
Scurlockstown, Clonarney, a townland in Clonarney civil parish, barony of Delvin, County Westmeath, Ireland
Scurlockstown, Portloman, a townland in Portloman civil parish, barony of Corkaree, County Westmeath, Ireland
Scurlock Foundation, charitable organization in Houston, Texas
Scurlock Oil Company, Texas corporation founded by Eddy C. Scurlock
Eddy Refining Company, oil refinery founded by Eddy C. Scurlock
Scurlock Publishing Company, magazine and book publisher in Texarkana, Texas
Shooting of James Scurlock